Kenud is a village of the Punasa tehsil of Khandwa district, in Madhya Pradesh state, India. The village is almost three hundred years old. Which was founded around 1700 AD by Joraji Singh Badal (Badaliya - Panwar). Most of the people of the village depend on agriculture, workers and youth are dependent on the nearby city of Mundi and Shree Singaji Thermal Power Project for employment.

Geography

History
Kenud Village was founded by Joraji Singh Badal (Badaliya - Panwar), around 1700 AD. whose caste was Kshatriya Rajput and descendant (Vadaliya Panwar) which later became (Badliya Panwar) and presently his descendants became (Badal Panwar), People knew from different surnames like Patel Sahab and Thakur Sahab.

Those who belonged to the village of Dhodwada and whose ancestors originally belonged to the Paramara dynasty, after the end of the rule of the Paramara dynasty in the 14th century, their descendants and relatives settled many small forts, towns, and villages in Malwa Nimar.

Parmar or Panwar was an Agnivansha Kshatriya dynasty of medieval India. The authority of this dynasty was up to the states of Dhar, Malwa, Nimar, Ujjayini, Abu Parbat, and Amarkot near Indus. Nearly all of Western India was a kingdom of the Paramara dynasty. They continued to rule from the 8th century to the 14th century. The root word has different abrasions according to the area of Pramar such as Panwar, Pawar, Powar, Puwar, Punwar, and Puar.

From the middle of the 16th century to the early 18th century, the Nimar region was under the rule of Aurangzeb, Bahadur Shah, Peshwa, Scindia, Holkar, Panwar, Marathas and Pindaris. Later from the 1818 Khandwa district was ceded by the Marathas to the British Raj, and later became part of Central Province and Berar Province. The region to the west, which forms the present Khargone district, was part of the princely state of Indore. And the rulers of all the villages of India were officially made zamindars by the British, and the governance of the village was seen only by the zamindars of the Badal family which continued till 1947.
 
After India's independence in 1947, Central Province and Berar Province became the new Indian state of Madhya Pradesh. Khandwa district was known as Nimar district before 1956, when the state of Central India was merged with the state of Madhya Pradesh in the west. The present Khargone district of Central India was also called Nimar, hence the districts were renamed as West and East Nimar. Nimar district was part of the Nerbudda (Narmada) Division of Central Province and Berar Province, which became the state of Central India (later Madhya Pradesh) after India's independence in 1947. Recently Khandwa was known as Eastern Nimar. On 15 August 2003, Burhanpur district was separated from Khandwa district. Khandwa district is a part of Indore division.
 
Before independence, the village was headed by ahead of the Badal family, after independence, the Zamindari system also went away with the British, a new constitution of independent India was made and the village was commanded by government officials like - Kotwar, Patwari, Police, District magistrate and other government officers. Adi went into the hands of the people, and in 1992, the villages of India started being governed by the system of Panchayati Raj, the government panchayat is of 2-3 villages and the traditional panchayat is different from each village, in some private cases of the village today. Even the traditional head of the village and the panchayat settle together, but most of the work is done by the government panchayat, currently, the village is headed by a sarpanch who heads the village panchayat.

Landmarks
 Mata Mandir Kenud
 Shiv Mandir Kenud
 Hanuman Mandir Kenud
 Bhilat Dev Mandir Kenud
 Shri Narsingh Bhagwan Dham Ashram Kenud

 Kenud Talab (Punasa Lift Irrigation Scheme BR-2 Kenud Pond)

Education

Colleges 
Govt. I.T.I College Mundi
Lions College Mundi
Government Degree College Mundi

Schools 
 Govt. Primary School Kenud
 Govt. Middle School Kenud
 Govt. Boy's Higher Sec. School Mundi
 Govt. Girls Higher Sec. School Mundi
 St. Mary's Convent High School Mundi
 Janpad Hr. Sec. School Mundi
 Sant Singaji Higher Secondary School Mundi
 Lions Hr. Sec. School Mundi
 Aasha Devi Public School Mundi
 Saraswati Vidya Mandir Mundi
 Model Public School Mundi
 Sanskar Public School Mundi
 Saraswati Shishu Vidya Mandir Mundi
 Rewottama International School Kenud Road Mundi

Health
 Government Hospital Mundi
 Gupta Nurshing Home Mundi
 Charak Hospital Mundi

Transport
Kenud is connected to SH-41 (Khandwa–Mundi–Ashta State Highway) and SH-41A (Omkareshwer–Nagar–Punasa State Highway); it is linked to Indore, Khandwa, Bhopal, Burhanpur, Nagpur and others. Indian Railways started a Khandwa–Bir passenger route to connect  to Kenud. More than two hundred buses operate and provide road connectivity to major cities of the state. The local transport system includes minibuses, and tempos provide connectivity to more than forty nearby villages.

References

Villages in Khandwa district